The following highways are numbered 18D:

United States
 Nebraska Spur 18D
 New York State Route 18D (former)

See also
List of highways numbered 18